The 2014–15 UNC Greensboro Spartans men's basketball team represented the University of North Carolina at Greensboro during the 2014–15 NCAA Division I men's basketball season. The Spartans, led by fourth year head coach Wes Miller, played their home games at the Greensboro Coliseum, with two home games at Fleming Gymnasium, and were members of the Southern Conference. They finished the season 11–22, 6–12 in SoCon play to finish in a three way tie for seventh place. They advanced to the quarterfinals of the SoCon tournament where they lost to Wofford.

Roster

Schedule

|-
!colspan=9 style="background:#003366; color:#FFCC00;"| Regular season

|-
!colspan=9 style="background:#003366; color:#FFCC00;"|  SoCon tournament

References

UNC Greensboro Spartans men's basketball seasons
UNC Greensboro
2014 in sports in North Carolina
2015 in sports in North Carolina